Sir Cyril Astley Clarke, KBE, FRCP, FRCOG, (Hon) FRC Path, FRS (22 August 1907 – 21 November 2000) was a British physician, geneticist and lepidopterist. He was honoured for his pioneering work on prevention of Rh disease of the newborn, and also for his work on the genetics of the Lepidoptera (butterflies and moths).

Biography
Cyril Clarke was born on 22 August 1907 in Leicester, England and received his school education at Wyggeston Grammar School for Boys, Leicester and at the independent Oundle School near Peterborough. His interest in butterflies and moths began at school. His studied natural science at Gonville and Caius College, Cambridge, graduating in 1929, and then medicine at Guy's Hospital, London, graduating in 1932. During the Second World War he worked as a medical specialist in the Royal Naval Volunteer Reserve. After the war Clarke worked as a registrar at the Queen Elizabeth Hospital in Birmingham and then as Consultant Physician at the United Liverpool Hospitals. In 1963 he was appointed Director of the Nuffield Unit of Medical Genetics based at the University of Liverpool and two years later was made Professor of Medicine. He held these posts until his retirement in 1972. In retirement he served as President of the Royal College of Physicians (1972–1977)

Clarke helped to develop the technique of giving Rh-negative women inter-muscular injections of anti-RhD antibodies during pregnancy to prevent Rh disease in their newborn babies. This was one of the major advances in preventive medicine in the second half of the 20th century.

Clarke answered an advert in an insect magazine for swallowtail butterfly pupae that had been placed by Philip Sheppard. They met and began working together in their common interest of lepidoptery. From 1959 they started running a moth trap in Caldy Common near West Kirby, Wirral, England. They studied the peppered moth, the scarlet tiger moth and swallowtail butterfly. They published papers on the genetics of Lepidoptera and also on Rh disease. Clarke continued research in his retirement and in 1988 he rediscovered a scarlet tiger moth colony on the Wirral Way, West Kirby, that had been started in 1961 by Philip Sheppard. The colony was useful for study of the genetics of changes in populations.

He married Frieda (or Féo) in 1934. Lady Clarke died in 1998. Cyril Clarke died in 2000. They had three sons, one of whom is a consultant neurologist.

Career and awards 

 Second World War – Medic in Royal Navy Volunteer Reserve
 1947 to 1958 – Part-time Clinical Lecturer at Liverpool University, England.
 1958 to 1965 – Reader at Liverpool University, England.
 1965 to 1972 – Professor of Medicine at Liverpool University, England. Later, Honorary Nuffield Research Fellow, Department of Genetics and Emeritus Professor of Medicine, University of Liverpool. Director, Research Unit, Royal College of Physicians of London.
 1967 – Lumleian lecture to Royal College of Physicians on Prevention of Rh-Haemolytic Disease

Awards and accolades
 1969 – Order of the British Empire (CBE)
 19 March 1970 – Fellow of the Royal Society (FRS)
 1972 to 1977 – President of the Royal College of Physicians of London.
 1974 – Knighted
 1977 – Gairdner Foundation International Award
 1980 –  Lasker Award – Prof Cyril Clarke, together with Dr Ronald Finn, Dr John Gorman, Dr Vincent Freda, and Dr William Pollack were jointly awarded the Albert Lasker Award for Clinical Medical Research for their pioneering work on the rhesus blood group system, the role of rhesus D antibodies in the causation of Rh disease and the prevention of Rh disease.
 1981 – Linnean Medal from the Linnean Society of London.
 1990 – Buchanan Medal from the Royal Society of the United Kingdom for work on haemolytic disease of the newborn.
 1992 – Honorary Degree given by the College of William and Mary, Williamsburg, Virginia, United States.

Bibliography

See also 
 Peppered moth evolution

References

Bibliography
 Obituary on Liverpool University website – includes a photograph
 
 1980 Lasker award to Prof Cyril Clarke
 RCP Presidents

1907 births
2000 deaths
People from Leicester
People educated at Wyggeston Grammar School for Boys
People educated at Oundle School
20th-century English medical doctors
English lepidopterists
English geneticists
Medical geneticists
Fellows of the Royal Society
Alumni of Gonville and Caius College, Cambridge
Academics of the University of Liverpool
Commanders of the Order of the British Empire
Knights Bachelor
Fellows of the Royal College of Physicians
Presidents of the Royal College of Physicians
Linnean Medallists
20th-century British zoologists
Fellows of the Royal Entomological Society
Recipients of the Lasker-DeBakey Clinical Medical Research Award
Recipients of the James Spence Medal
Royal Naval Volunteer Reserve personnel of World War II